South Korean girl group T-ara has released four studio albums (one of which was re-released under a different title), nine extended plays (four of which were re-released under different titles), two compilation albums, two remix albums, two single albums, and thirty-six singles (including five collaboration singles), and six promotional singles. T-ara's debut studio album Absolute First Album (2009) peaked at number two on South Korea's Gaon Album Chart and yielded two South Korean top-ten singles, "Bo Peep Bo Peep" and "Like the First Time". Its 2010 reissue, Breaking Heart, reached number two in South Korea and spawned the number-one single "You Drive Me Crazy", which sold over three million digital copies.

T-ara's first EP, Temptastic, was released in December 2010. The EP spawned two South Korean top-five singles, "What's Wrong" and "Yayaya". The group's 2011 EP John Travolta Wannabe peaked at number three on the Gaon Album Chart. Its single "Roly-Poly" peaked atop the Korea K-Pop Hot 100 chart and was the highest-selling digital single of 2011 in South Korea, with over four million digital downloads. The group earned a string of South Korean number-one singles in 2011 and 2012 with "Cry Cry", "We Were In Love", and "Lovey-Dovey", the last of which was the second best-selling digital single of 2012 in South Korea with over 3.7 million units sold.

The group's first Japanese-language album, Jewelry Box (2012), peaked at number two on the Japanese Oricon albums chart and was certified gold by the Recording Industry Association of Japan (RIAJ). Its lead single, the Japanese version of their 2009 Korean single "Bo Peep Bo Peep", peaked atop the Oricon singles chart and the Japan Hot 100, and was certified gold by the RIAJ. The same year, T-ara released an EP titled Day by Day, and its reissue titled Mirage. The singles "Day by Day" and "Sexy Love" both ranked among the top 100 best-selling singles of 2012 in South Korea. In August 2013, the group released their second Japanese-language studio album Treasure Box, which peaked at number four on the Oricon chart and spawned two Oricon top five singles: "Sexy Love" and "Bunny Style!".

T-ara's fifth Korean EP Again was released in October 2013. The EP reached number two on the Gaon Album Chart and yielded a South Korean top-five single titled "Number Nine". The group has released four further EPs, And & End (2014), So Good (2015), Remember (2016), and What's My Name (2017), all of which managed to reach the top five in South Korea. And & End included the single "Sugar Free", which is the group's highest-charting song on the Billboard World Digital Songs, peaking at number four.

Albums

Studio albums

Compilation albums

Reissues

Remix albums

Extended plays

Single albums

Singles

Collaboration singles

Promotional singles

Other charted songs

Notes

References

Discography
Discographies of South Korean artists
K-pop music group discographies